XHTLX-FM is a radio station on 100.5 FM in Tlaxiaco, Oaxaca. It is known as La Poderosa with a grupera format.

History
XETLX-AM 1040 received its concession on February 25, 1993. It was owned by Fernando del Sagrado Corazón de Jesús Laris Rodríguez Zetina, but he quickly sold it to local interests who brought the station on air January 2, 1995. XETLX initially broadcast as a daytimer with 1 kW. In 2001, it moved to 830 kHz in order to increase its power to 6 kW.

References

Radio stations in Oaxaca